Dim Mak is an American death metal band from New Jersey, United States. The band was formed from the ashes of Ripping Corpse, by guitarist Shaune Kelley, vocalist Scott Ruth, and drummer Brandon Thomas.  Thomas left the band sometime after the release of Intercepting Fist to later join The Dying Light.

The band's lyrical and thematic inspirations include martial arts, Bruce Lee, human rage and violence, Lovecraft's Cthulhu Mythos, battles, etc.

Albums
 Enter the Dragon (1999) - Dies Irae Records
 Intercepting Fist (2002) - Olympic Records/Mighty Music
 Knives of Ice (2006) - Willowtip Records
 The Emergence of Reptilian Altars (2011) - Willowtip Records

Current lineup
 Shaune Kelley (ex-Hate Eternal, ex-Ripping Corpse) - guitars
 Joey Capizzi (ex-Cattlepress, ex-The Dying Light) - vocals
 John Longstreth (Origin) - drums
 Scot Hornick - bass

References

External links
Willowtip Records
DIM MAK

American death metal musical groups
Musical groups from New Jersey